Rudik Makarian (born 2004 in Alatuman, Georgia) is a Georgian-born Russian chess player. He was awarded the title of International Master in 2019.

Chess career
Makarian won the U-16 World Youth Chess Championship in 2019 and the Russian Junior Chess Championship in 2020.

He qualified to play in the Chess World Cup 2021 where he was defeated 1½-½ by Kacper Piorun in the first round.

References

External links

Rudik Makarian chess games at 365Chess.com

2004 births
Living people
Russian chess players
Russian sportspeople of Armenian descent
Georgian emigrants to Russia
Chess International Masters
People from Samtskhe–Javakheti